Laurent Brandenbourger is a Belgian screenwriter and film director. In 2009, he co-wrote with Nabil Ben Yadir and Sébastien Fernandez the comedy film The Barons, for which he received a nomination for the Magritte Award for Best Screenplay.

References

External links

1967 births
Living people
Belgian film directors
Belgian screenwriters